Catlin may refer to:

People with the surname
Albertus W. Catlin (1868–1933), US Marine Corps Brigadier General & Medal of Honor recipient
Charles L. Catlin (1842-1901), American lawyer and politician
David Catlin (born 1952), American mathematician
George Catlin (1796–1872), American painter
George Catlin (political scientist) (1896–1979), English academic and politician
John Catlin (politician) (1803–1874), acting governor of the Wisconsin Territory
Karen Catlin (born 1963), American technology executive and advocate
Kelly Catlin (1995–2019), American racing cyclist
Mark Catlin, Jr. (1910-1986), American politician, lawyer
Mark Catlin, Sr. (1882–1956) American football coach, politician, lawyer
Nathaniel Catelyn (c.1589-1637), politician and judge in Ireland
Sir Nevill Catlin (1634-1702), English landowner and politician
Nicholas Catlin (born 1989), English hockey player
Norman Catlin (1918–1941), English footballer
Paul Catlin (1948-1995), American mathematician, graph theory
Stanton Catlin (1915-1997), American art historian
Steven David Catlin (born 1944), American serial killer
Ted Catlin (1910–1990), English footballer

Places
New Zealand
 The Catlins, an area of New Zealand
United States
 Catlin Township, Marion County, Kansas
 Catlin, Illinois, a village in Vermilion County, Illinois
 Catlin, Indiana, an unincorporated community in Parke County
 Catlin, New York, a town in Chemung County, New York

Other
 Catlin (surgery), an archaic medical instrument
 The Catlin Gabel School, a private school southwest of Portland, Oregon
 The Catlins (TV series), on the TBS cable network
 Catlin Group Limited, an international specialty insurance and reinsurance company
 Chris Cattlin (born 1946), English footballer
 Mt Cattlin mine, mine in Western Australia